Chaparral High School is the main continuation high school located in El Cajon, California for the Grossmont Union High School District (GUHSD). Currently GUHSD serves 24,456 students at 12 high schools. Located in the city of El Cajon, it provides an alternative educational setting for an average of 300 students, eighty of which are designated Special Education, in grades nine through twelve.

Students at Chaparral are referred by the eleven comprehensive high schools in the District for reasons involving poor attendance, lack of academic success or behavioral issues. In addition, students may voluntarily elect to attend Chaparral. The student population changes as students are returned to their school of residence upon completion of their remediation and/or academic goals. Chaparral offers programs and services to supplement the basic education program. Some of these services include an incoming orientation, Special Education Program, extended day tutorials and Title I support.

Chaparral High School teaches programs such as Anger Management, and many other programs that students can use to fit into their daily lifestyles.

See also
List of high schools in San Diego County, California

References

Chaparral High School - School Accountability Report Card 2004-2005
Grossmont Union High School District - School Mascots and Colors
Western Association of Schools and Colleges Directory of Accredited Schools 2005-2006

External links
Chaparral High School

Educational institutions established in 1972
High schools in San Diego County, California
Continuation high schools in California
Public high schools in California
Education in El Cajon, California
1972 establishments in California